Tetrabutylammonium chloride is the organic compound with the formula (C4H9)4NCl. A white water-soluble solid, it is a quaternary ammonium salt of chloride. It is a precursor to other tetrabutylammonium salts. Often tetrabutylammonium bromide is preferred as a source of tetrabutylammonium because it is less hygroscopic than the chloride.

References

Tetrabutylammonium salts
Chlorides